Diascia may refer to:
 Diascia (moth), a genus of moths
 Diascia (plant), a genus of plants